Weraura Rural LLG is a local-level government (LLG) of Milne Bay Province, Papua New Guinea.

Wards
01. Divari
02. Kwabunaki
03. Rumaruma
04. Damayadona
05. Wedau
06. Manubada
07. Vidia
08. Radava
09. Gadoa
10. Wadobuna
11. Nakara
12. Uga
13. Augwana
14. Sirisiri
15. Taramugu
16. Ikara
17. Taubadi
18. Bidiesi
19. Awawa
20. Dombosaina
21. Warawadidi
22. Bowadi
23. Danobu
24. Karagautu
25. Wanama
26. Boiaboia
27. Gadovisu
28. Didia
29. Mainawa
30. Pova

References

Local-level governments of Milne Bay Province